The Embassy of Cameroon in Moscow is the diplomatic mission of Cameroon in the Russian Federation. It is located at 35 Bolshaya Ordynka

See also
Diplomatic missions of Cameroon
 Cameroon–Russia relations
 Diplomatic missions in Russia

References

Cameroon–Russia relations
Cameroon
Moscow
Arbat District